Coleophora vansoni is a species of moth in the family Coleophoridae. It is found in Namibia and South Africa (Northern Cape, Eastern Cape, Western Cape).

References 

 

vansoni
Moths described in 2015
Moths of Africa